The BBC 2 Floodlit Trophy (also known as the BBC 2 Television Trophy) was a competition for British rugby league clubs held between 1965 and 1980. It was designed specifically for television, and the then director of BBC2, broadcaster David Attenborough, was instrumental in its creation. When the competition was first mooted not many clubs were equipped with floodlights, but the tournament caused no fewer than twenty-one clubs to install them.

The tournament was not Rugby League's first foray into evening television; the 1955–56 season saw a tournament titled the Independent Television Floodlit Trophy. Eight clubs participated in a series of games played at football grounds in the London area, with Warrington eventually running out 43–18 victors over Leigh.

The tournament was played during the early part of the season. Each week one match would be played under floodlights on a Tuesday evening; the second half of this match that would be broadcast live on BBC2. Non-televised matches were played at various times, depending on clubs' commitments in more prestigious tournaments. Despite the title many matches did not take place under floodlights; clubs such as Barrow and Bramley (for example) did not possess adequate lighting.

The first season, 1965–66, eight clubs - Castleford, Leeds, Leigh, Oldham, St. Helens, Swinton, Warrington and Widnes took part. Seven of the eight teams had floodlights and Leeds installed theirs the following season.

The four-tackles-then-a-scrum rule was first introduced in the competition's second season, in October 1966, before being implemented in all competitions by December.

Castleford won the trophy in the first season, 1965–66 and won the trophy the most times, on three more occasions 1966–67, 1967–68 and 1976–77.

Despite disagreements over shirt sponsorship in the early 1970s, Rugby League remained a mainstay of BBC Television during the 1970s, and 1980s, although the commitment to the Floodlit Trophy decreased before financial cutbacks at the BBC lead to its cancellation after the 1979–80 competition. In the last final, Hull F.C. beat local rivals Hull Kingston Rovers.

List of finals

References

External links
 BBC Floodlit Trophy results – Rugby league Project
 Hull FC v Hall KR – BBC Floodlight Trophy Final 1979–80

 
Rugby league competitions in the United Kingdom
1965 establishments in the United Kingdom
1980 disestablishments in the United Kingdom
Recurring sporting events established in 1965
Recurring events disestablished in 1980
BBC events